This is a list of members of the Swiss Council of States of the 50th legislature (2015–2019). The members were elected in the 2015 Swiss federal election.

Elected members

See also
Political parties of Switzerland for the abbreviations
List of members of the Swiss Council of States (2003-2007)
List of members of the Swiss Council of States (2007–11)
Presidents of the Council of States
List of members of the Swiss National Council

References

2015